Moshe Greenberg (Hebrew: משה גרינברג; July 10, 1928 – May 15, 2010) was an American rabbi, Bible scholar, and professor emeritus of the Hebrew University of Jerusalem.

Biography
Moshe Greenberg was born in Philadelphia in 1928. Raised in a Hebrew-speaking Zionist home, he studied Bible and Hebrew literature from his youth. His father, Rabbi Simon Greenberg, was the rabbi of Har Zion Temple and one of the most important leaders of the Conservative movement. Moshe Greenberg received his doctorate from the  University of Pennsylvania in 1954, studying  Bible and Assyriology under E. A. Speiser; simultaneously, he studied post-Biblical Judaica at the Jewish Theological Seminary of America (JTSA), where he was ordained as a rabbi. Greenberg was married to Evelyn Gelber and had three sons. He died in Jerusalem after a long illness.

Academic and literary career
Greenberg taught Bible and Judaica at the University of Pennsylvania from 1964-1970.  He held a chair in Jewish studies at the Hebrew University of Jerusalem, an institution at which he had taught since 1970. He also taught at Swarthmore College, the JTSA,  the University of California, Berkeley and the Schechter Institute of Jewish Studies.  Greenberg was editor-in-chief of the Ketuvim section of the Jewish Publication Society of America's new English translation of the Bible. He was the author of ten books and numerous articles. From 1994-1995 he held a fellowship at the Katz Center for Advanced Judaic Studies, doing research in Historiography.

Scholarship
Greenberg was the first Jewish Bible scholar appointed to a position in a secular university after World War II and had an important influence on the development of Biblical scholarship. He focused on the phenomenology of biblical religion and law, the theory and practice of interpreting biblical texts, and the role of  the Bible in Jewish thought. In the area of prayer, Greenberg studied the development of biblical petition and  praise, which he portrayed as  "a vehicle of humility, an expression of  un-selfsufficiency, which in biblical thought, is the proper stance  of  humans before God" (Studies, 75-108). He showed that the prose prayers embedded in biblical narratives reflect the piety of commoners, and reasoned that the frequency of spontaneous prayer strengthened the egalitarian tendency of Israelite religion which led to the establishment  of  the  synagogue. In the  area  of biblical law, Greenberg argued that "the law [is] the expression of underlying postulates or  values of culture" and that differences  between biblical and ancient Near Eastern laws  were not reflections  of  different stages of social  development  but  of different underlying legal and religious principles (Studies, 25-41). Analyzing economic, social,  political,  and religious laws in the Torah, he showed that they dispersed authority throughout society and prevented the monopolization of prestige and  power by narrow elite groups (Studies, 51-61). In his commentaries on Exodus (1969) and Ezekiel  (1983, 1997), Greenberg developed  a "holistic"  method  of  exegesis, redirecting attention from the text's  "hypothetically  reconstructed  elements"  to the  biblical  books  as integral  wholes and products of  thoughtful  and  artistic design. 	Greenberg's studies of Jewish thought include studies of the  intellectual  achievements  of  medieval  Jewish   exegesis, investigations  of rabbinic  reflections on defying illegal orders (Studies, 395-403), and  attitudes toward members of other  religions  (Studies, 369-393; "A Problematic Heritage"). He argued that a  Scripture-based  religion must avoid fundamentalism through selectivity and re-prioritizing values.

Awards
 In 1961, Greenberg was awarded a Guggenheim Fellowship.
 He was also awarded  the Harrison Prize for Distinguished Teaching and Research.
 In 1994, he was awarded the Israel Prize in Bible. Greenberg also taught at Beyt Midrash leShalom, the Peace Study Center sponsored jointly by the Israeli Religious Peace Movement Netivot Shalom and by Tikkun Magazine.

Published works
Hab Piru, 1955
Introduction to Hebrew, 1965
Understanding Exodus, 1967
Biblical Prose Prayer as a Window to the Popular Religion of Ancient Israel, 1983
Ezekiel in the Anchor Bible Series 3 volumes,  1983, 1997 (third volume was to be completed by Jacob Milgrom, who died June 5, 2010)
Torah: Five Books of Moses, 2000

See also 
List of Israel Prize recipients

References

Bibliography 
 Moshe Greenberg: An Appreciation," and "Bibliography of the Writings of Moshe Greenberg," pp. ix-xxxviii in M. Cogan, B.L. Eichler, and J.H. Tigay, eds., Tehilla le-Moshe. Biblical and Judaic
 Studies in Honor of Moshe Greenberg. Winona Lake, Indiana: Eisenbrauns, 1997
 S.D. Sperling, ed., Students of the Covenant: A History of Jewish Biblical Scholarship in North America (Atlanta: Scholars Press, 1992), index s.v. "Greenberg, Moshe."
 Pras Yisra'el 5754 (Israel Prizes, 1994). Israel: Ministry of Science and Arts; Ministry of Education, Culture, and Sports, 1994), pp. 5–7 (in Hebrew)

1928 births
2010 deaths
Jewish biblical scholars
Israeli biblical scholars
American biblical scholars
Israel Prize in biblical studies recipients
Translators of the Bible into English
Judaic scholars
Academic staff of the Hebrew University of Jerusalem
American emigrants to Israel
20th-century American Jews
Rabbis from Philadelphia
Jewish translators of the Bible
20th-century translators
20th-century Jewish biblical scholars
20th-century Israeli rabbis